David Carroll Eddings (July 7, 1931 – June 2, 2009) was an American fantasy writer. With his wife Leigh, he authored several best-selling  epic fantasy novel series, including The Belgariad (1982–84), The Malloreon (1987–91), The Elenium (1989–91), The Tamuli (1992–94), and The Dreamers (2003–06).

Biography
Eddings was born in Spokane, Washington, to George Wayne Eddings and Theone (Berge) Eddings, in 1931. Eddings has stated that he is part Cherokee.

Early life
Eddings grew up near Puget Sound in the City of Snohomish. After graduating from Snohomish High School in 1949, he worked for a year before majoring in speech, drama and English at junior college. Eddings displayed an early talent for drama and literature, winning a national oratorical contest, and performing the male lead in most of his drama productions. He graduated with a BA from Reed College in 1954, writing his first novel, How Lonely Are The Dead, as his senior thesis. After graduating from Reed College, Eddings was drafted into the U.S. Army, having also previously served in the National Guard. After being discharged in 1956, Eddings attended the graduate school of the University of Washington in Seattle for four years, graduating with an MA in 1961 after submitting a novel in progress, Man Running, for his thesis.

Eddings then worked as a purchaser for Boeing, where he met his future wife, then known as Judith Leigh Schall. They married in 1962, she taking the name Leigh Eddings, and through most of the 1960s, Eddings worked as an assistant professor at Black Hills State College in South Dakota.

Child abuse
David and Leigh Eddings adopted one boy in 1966, Scott David, then two months old. They adopted a younger girl between 1966 and 1969.

In 1970 the couple lost custody of both children and were each sentenced to a year in jail in separate trials after pleading guilty to 11 counts of physical child abuse.  According to the Black Hills Weekly, February 11, 1970, the couple's four year old adopted child was found in the pitch-black basement of their home, locked in a cage, wearing nothing but a tee-shirt. The child had been physically abused with a heavily swollen and disabled hand with scrapes, and heavy bruising about his body, as well as evidence of prior beatings.  Investigators during the trial noted that there were restraints on the walls, no lighting, and the strong smell of cat urine in the basement.  Though the abuse, the trial, and the sentencing were all extensively reported in South Dakota newspapers at the time, these details did not resurface in media coverage of the couple during their successful joint career as authors, only returning to public attention several years after both had died.

After both served their sentences, David and Leigh Eddings moved to Denver in 1971, where David found work in a grocery store.

Literary career
Eddings had completed the first draft of his first published novel, High Hunt, in March 1971 while serving his jail term. High Hunt was a contemporary story of four young men hunting deer, and like many of his later novels, it explores themes of manhood and coming of age. Convinced that being an author was his future career, after a short period in Denver, David and Leigh Eddings moved to Spokane, where he once again relied on a job at a grocery shop for his funds. High Hunt was published in early 1972 by G.P. Putnam's Sons to modestly positive reviews.

Eddings continued to work on several unpublished novels, including Hunseeker's Ascent, a story about mountain climbing, which was later burned, as Eddings claimed it was "a piece of tripe so bad it even bored me." Most of his attempts followed the same vein as High Hunt: adventure stories and contemporary tragedies. None were sold or published, with the eventual exception of The Losers, which tells the story of God and the Devil, cast in the roles of Raphael Taylor, gifted student and athlete, and Damon Flood, scoundrel determined to bring Raphael down. Though written in the 1970s, The Losers was not published until June 1992, well after Eddings' success as an author was established.

Success in fantasy
Eddings doodled a fantasy map one morning before work. According to Eddings, several years later, upon seeing a copy of Tolkien's The Lord of the Rings, in a bookshop, he muttered, "Is this old turkey still floating around?", and was shocked to learn that it was in its 78th printing. However, he had already included Tolkien's work in the syllabuses for at least three sections of his English Literature survey courses in the summer of 1967 and the springs of 1968 and 1969. Eddings subsequently began to annotate his previous doodle, which became the geographical basis for the country of Aloria. Over the course of a year he added names to various kingdoms, races, and characters, and invented various theologies and a mythology, all of which counted about 230 pages.

Because the Lord of the Rings had been published as three books, Eddings believed fantasy in general was supposed to be trilogies. He initially laid out The Belgariad as a trilogy as well, until his editor Lester del Rey told him the booksellers would refuse to accept 600-page books. Instead del Rey suggested the series should be published as five books. Eddings at first refused, but having already signed the contract, and with Del Rey's promise that he would receive advances for five books instead of three, eventually agreed.  Pawn of Prophecy, the first volume in the series, was issued in April 1982.

The Belgariad series of books (published in five volumes between 1982 and 1984) were popular, and Eddings would continue to produce fantasy material for the rest of his life, usually producing a book every year or two.

By 1995, new books were credited jointly to David and Leigh Eddings; Eddings explained in a brief foreword that their working together as authors "had been the case from the beginning." This is generally accepted to be broadly accurate, although Eddings scholar James Gifford notes that collaboration would have been "impossible" with Eddings' first published novel High Hunt, as David Eddings' own notes show that the first draft was completed while he and Leigh were both in different jails, about half-way through their terms.

The Eddingses' final work, the novel series The Dreamers, was published in four volumes between 2003 and 2006.

Later life
On January 26, 2007 Eddings accidentally burned about a quarter of his office, next door to his house, along with his Excalibur sports car.

On February 28, 2007, David Eddings' wife Leigh died following a series of strokes that left her unable to communicate. She was 69. Eddings cared for her at home with her mother after her first stroke, which occurred three years before he finished writing The Dreamers.

Eddings died of natural causes on June 2, 2009 in Carson City, Nevada.

Dennis, Eddings' brother, said that he had suffered from dementia for a long time, but that the disease had progressed rapidly since September, and that he needed 24-hour care. He also confirmed that in his last months, his brother had been working on a manuscript that was unlike any of his other works, stating "It was very, very different. I wouldn't call it exactly a satire of fantasy but it sure plays with the genre". The unfinished work, along with his other manuscripts, went to his alma mater, Reed College, along with a bequest of $18 million to fund "students and faculty studying languages and literature." Eddings also bequeathed $10 million to the National Jewish Medical and Research Center in Denver for pediatric asthma treatment and research; Eddings' wife Leigh had asthma throughout her life.

Bibliography

References

External links 

 Interview with David Eddings at sffworld.com
 
 Novel synopses, cover art, and reviews at FantasyLiterature.net 
 Descendants of John Eddings and Elizabeth Weaver (Cherokee) 

1931 births
2009 deaths
American fantasy writers
20th-century American novelists
21st-century American novelists
People from Carson City, Nevada
Writers from Spokane, Washington
Reed College alumni
University of Washington alumni
Writers from Nevada
American male novelists
20th-century American male writers
21st-century American male writers
Novelists from Washington (state)
American people who self-identify as being of Native American descent